Sphaeropsis tumefaciens is an ascomycete fungus that is a plant pathogen infecting citruses.

References

External links 
 Index Fungorum
 USDA ARS Fungal Database

Fungi described in 1911
Fungal citrus diseases
Ascomycota enigmatic taxa